Jassem Al-Mulla (Arabic:جاسم الملا) (born 6 February 1996) is a Qatari footballer who plays as a defender.

References

External links
 

1996 births
Living people
Qatari footballers
Association football defenders
Aspire Academy (Qatar) players
El Jaish SC players
Al Ahli SC (Doha) players
Qatar Stars League players